Lycosa aragogi is a species of the araneomorph spider family Lycosidae endemic to Kerman Province, Iran. The female holotype measured 26 mm, (excluding the legs), with two black and three white stripes of setae on its cephalothorax, black setae on its chelicerae, and scattered dots and patterns of black and white setae on its abdomen.

Discovery and naming 
This species was named after Aragog, the fictional spider from "Harry Potter" series by J.K. Rowling, as it resembled the animatronic puppet version of this character created for the movie Harry Potter and the Chamber of Secrets. Another reason for this eponymy was the celebration of the 20th anniversary of the whole "Harry Potter" series in 2017. The single specimen was collected by Iranian entomologist Alireza Naderi in a mountainous region of southeastern Iran's Kerman Province on 26 April 2016, just over 19 years after Aragog died (20 April 1997, according to the "Harry Potter" series), and later described by arachnologists Anton Nadolny and Alireza Zamani in a paper published in the journal Zootaxa.

References 

Endemic fauna of Iran
Lycosidae
Spiders described in 2017